Mladen Bajić (born 28 December 1950 in Split) is the former State Attorney General of the Republic of Croatia.

Bajić graduated from the Faculty of Law in Split in 1975. After graduating, he worked at the District Attorney's offices in Dubrovnik and Split. He became the Deputy District Attorney in Split in 1987, advancing to District Attorney in 2001.

Bajić was named the State Attorney General in 2002, succeeding Radovan Ortynski. He was reelected twice, in 2006 and 2010, and was succeeded by Dinko Cvitan in 2014.

Sources
Životopis Mladena Bajića 
Mladen Bajić - Odvjetnik koji je pomaknuo civilizacijske zidove 
Prisegnuo novi glavni državni: Bajić: Sposobni smo od Haaškog suda preuzeti progon ratnih zločina 

1950 births
Attorneys general
Lawyers from Split, Croatia
Living people